Hausen am Tann is a town in the Zollernalbkreis district of Baden-Württemberg, Germany.

History
In 1938, that district was merged into the new . There was modest development in Hausen after World War II in the 1950s. There was some additional development to the north and southwest in the late 1990s.

Geography
Elevation above sea level in the municipality ranges from a high of  Normalnull (NN) at the top of the Schafberg to a low of  NN in the valley of the Schlichem.

A portion of the Federally-protected  nature reserve is located inside Hausen's municipal area.

Coat of arms
Hausen's coat of arms displays two white foothold trap jaws upon a field of blue. This pattern was awarded by the provisional Württemberg-Hohenzollern government on 13 February 1950. A flag was issued by the Zollernalb district office on 31 March 1982.

Transportation
Hausen is only connected to Germany's roadways by the K7170.

Citations

Württemberg